This is a list of squares in the city of Minsk, capital of Belarus.

List of squares

See also 

List of cities in Belarus

Notes

References 

 
Squares in Minsk